Proeulia mauleana is a species of moth of the family Tortricidae. It is found in the Maule Region of Chile.

The wingspan is 21.5 mm. The ground colour of the forewings is ochreous yellow, but cream costally and pale brownish rust in the dorsal half. The hindwings are cream, but the anal area is pale brownish.

Etymology
The species name refers to the type locality.

References

Moths described in 2010
Proeulia
Moths of South America
Taxa named by Józef Razowski
Endemic fauna of Chile